Juan Rodríguez (born 23 May 1958) is a Cuban wrestler. He competed in the men's freestyle 57 kg at the 1980 Summer Olympics.

References

1958 births
Living people
Cuban male sport wrestlers
Olympic wrestlers of Cuba
Wrestlers at the 1980 Summer Olympics
Place of birth missing (living people)